Langdon Webster Goodyear Jr. (June 13, 1924 – October 4, 2006) was a one-term mayor of Eau Gallie, Florida from December 1955 to December 1956.

Early life
Langdon Webster Goodyear Jr. was born on June 13, 1924 in Inverness, Florida to Langdon Goodyear, Sr. (1888–1967) and his wife Sara V. Priest (1901–1994). He graduated from Lakeland High School and attended Florida Southern College. In 1960, he graduated from the University of Florida, School of Pharmacy.

Career
During World War II, he served with the 349th Infantry, 88th Division "Blue Devils". He earned the Bronze Star Medal and the French Liberation Medal.

After earning his Pharmacy degree after the War, he horked at Coleman's Pharmacy in Eau Gallie, and in 1956, he opened Goodyear Pharmacy at the corner of Eau Gallie and Highland Avenues.  He later worked as a manager at Grey's Drug Store, Broward Drug, and retired from SupeRx Drugs in 1989.

Public office
From December 1955 to December 1956, Goodyear served as the 30th Mayor of Eau Gallie, Florida, today known as Melbourne, Florida.

Personal life
He was married to Katheryn "Kitty" Louise Roux (1923–2016) and lived in Dunnellon. Together they had:
Langdon Webster Goodyear III (1946–1946)
Stuart Scott Goodyear (1953–1955)
Randy Goodyear
Tod Goodyear
Kathy Goodyear Slattery

A practicing Methodist, Goodyear taught Sunday School and Bible study. He also wrote poetry and short stories

Goodyear died on October 4, 2006 in Polk County, Florida.

Associations 

 Member, Lambda Chi Alpha fraternity
 Founding President, Eau Gallie Kiwanis Club
 Founding President, Eau Gallie Lions Club
 Member, Eau Gallie Masons Lodge
 Member, Harbor City Boat Club
 Member, Eau Gallie Police Auxiliary 
 Member, Brevard County Sheriff Auxiliary and Posse
 Member, Brevard County Pharmacy Association
 Member, St. Paul's Methodist Church

References 

1924 births
2006 deaths
American Freemasons
Methodists from Florida
United States Army personnel of World War II
American pharmacists
Florida city council members
Florida Southern College alumni
Mayors of Melbourne, Florida
People from Inverness, Florida
People from Polk County, Florida
University of Florida alumni
20th-century American politicians
People from Eau Gallie, Florida
People from Dunnellon, Florida